The 1961 World Wrestling Championships were held in Yokohama, Japan.

Medal table

Team ranking

Medal summary

Men's freestyle

Men's Greco-Roman

References
FILA Database

World Wrestling Championships
International wrestling competitions hosted by Japan
FILA
1961 in sport wrestling
June 1961 sports events in Asia